"I Don't Wanna Go On with You Like That" is a song from English musician Elton John's 21st studio album, Reg Strikes Back (1988), released as the lead single of the album. The track was written by John and his long-time songwriting partner, Bernie Taupin.

When John played this song with the band on his concerts, the intro had different arrangements as he regularly played it in his tours during the album tour, Sleeping with the Past Tour and the rest of 1990s before he retired it in 2000 as the One Night Only concert in Madison Square Garden remains the most recent performance of it.

Chart performance
Upon its release in 1988, the song reached number 30 on the UK Singles Chart and peaked at number two on the US Billboard Hot 100 in August 1988, becoming John's highest-charting hit of the 1980s in the US. The song also became John's eighth number-one on the Billboard Adult Contemporary chart. In Canada, the single peaked atop the RPM 100 Singles chart for three weeks, giving John his 13th chart-topper there.

Critical reception
American magazine Cash Box called "I Don't Wanna Go On with You Like That" "a straight-ahead dance/rocker that gets on a forward track and stays there" with "biting lyrics." Robin Smith from Record Mirror felt that John is "right on target" with the classic rock of the song. Richard Lowe from Smash Hits wrote, "His new tune's not much cop though. It's a lacklustre ditty that he probably knocked out one lazy afternoon and its only saving grace is the rather extraordinary popping noise that runs all the way through. Must be one of these new-fangled electric drums. Quite odd."

Other versions of the song
A 12-inch extended remix of the song by Shep Pettibone was released on vinyl during the song's initial release period. This remix appears on the CD box set compilation, To Be Continued..., released in 1990. The Just-Elton-and-His-piano mix of the song is also available (on the reissued 1999 version of the Reg Strikes Back album).

Track listings
 7-inch single
 "I Don't Wanna Go On with You Like That" – 4:32
 "Rope Around a Fool" – 3:46

 12-inch maxi
 "I Don't Wanna Go On with You Like That" (Shep Pettibone 12-inch Mix) – 7:20
 "I Don't Wanna Go On with You Like That" – 4:32
 "Rope Around a Fool" – 3:46

 CD maxi
 "I Don't Wanna Go On with You Like That" – 4:33
 "Rope Around a Fool" – 3:48
 "I Don't Wanna Go On with You Like That" (Shep Pettibone 12-inch Mix) – 7:16

Personnel
 Elton John – Roland RD-1000 digital piano, lead and harmony vocals
 Fred Mandel – synthesizers
 Davey Johnstone – acoustic guitar, backing vocals
 David Paton – bass
 Charlie Morgan – drums
 Dee Murray – backing vocals
 Nigel Olsson – backing vocals

Charts

Weekly charts

Year-end charts

References

External links
 

Songs about heartache
Songs about divorce
1988 singles
1988 songs
Elton John songs
MCA Records singles
Music videos directed by Russell Mulcahy
The Rocket Record Company singles
RPM Top Singles number-one singles
Song recordings produced by Chris Thomas (record producer)
Songs with lyrics by Bernie Taupin
Songs with music by Elton John